Aubrie "Brie" Rippner (born January 21, 1980) is an American retired tennis player.

Rippner won four singles and seven doubles titles on the ITF circuit in her career. On August 16, 1999, she reached her best singles ranking of world number 57. On December 9, 2002, she peaked at world number 92 in the doubles rankings.

Junior Grand Slam finals

Girls' singles

External links 
 
 

1980 births
Living people
American female tennis players
Tennis players from Los Angeles
21st-century American women